Mara Liasson (born June 13, 1955) is an American journalist and political pundit. She is the national political correspondent for NPR, and a contributor at Fox News Channel.

Early life
Liasson was born in New York City to a Jewish family. She grew up in Scarsdale, New York and graduated from Scarsdale High School in 1973. Additionally, when she was studying at Scarsdale High School, she was one of a few students to form the Scarsdale Alternative School, an experimental democratic community that still exists today. She is a graduate of Brown University (class of 1977) with a bachelor's degree in American history.

Career
Liasson was a freelance radio and television reporter in San Francisco and worked at Berkeley's KPFA before joining NPR in 1985. She was awarded a Knight-Bagehot Fellowship in Economics and Business Journalism to study at Columbia University Graduate School of Journalism for a year; she took leave to do that in 1988–89, then became NPR's congressional correspondent. She was NPR's White House correspondent from 1992 to 2001, receiving the White House Correspondents' Association's Merriman Smith Award for daily news coverage for 1994, 1995 and 1997. She is now NPR's national political correspondent.

She joined Fox News in 1997. She is a regular contributor to Special Report with Bret Baier and a panelist on FOX News Sunday.

She has also worked as a panelist for the WETA-TV weekend news program Washington Week, which is aired on many PBS member stations.

Personal life
She is married to Jonathan Cuneo, a partner in the law firm of Cuneo Gilbert & LaDuca in Washington, D.C. They have three children. Liasson is a member of the Sixth & I historic synagogue in Washington, D.C.

References

External links
 

1955 births
Jewish American writers
Brown University alumni
Living people
NPR personalities
American television reporters and correspondents
American television news anchors
People from Scarsdale, New York
American women television journalists
Fox News people
Scarsdale High School alumni
21st-century American Jews
21st-century American women